Craighill is a surname. Notable people with the surname include:

Frank Craighill, one of the founding partners of the sports marketing firm ProServ
John Millar, Lord Craighill (1817–1888), Scottish lawyer and judge
Lloyd Craighill (1886–1971), American missionary to China, born in Lynchburg, Virginia
Margaret D. Craighill (born 1898), the first woman commissioned officer in the United States Army Medical Corps
William Price Craighill (1833–1909), author, Union Army engineer in the American Civil War, and later served as Chief of Engineers

See also
Craighill Channel Lower Range Front Light, named for William Price Craighill, was the first caisson lighthouse built in the Chesapeake Bay in Maryland
Craighill Channel Lower Range Rear Light, one of a pair of range lights that marks the first section of the shipping channel into Baltimore harbor
Craighill Channel Upper Range Front Light, one of a pair of range lights that marks the second section of the shipping channel into Baltimore harbor
Craighill Channel Upper Range Rear Light, one of a pair of range lights that marks the second section of the shipping channel into Baltimore harbor